was a Sō clan daimyō (feudal lord) of the domain of Tsushima on Tsushima Island at the end of Japan's Sengoku period, and into the Edo period. His name is sometimes read as Yoshitomo. Under the influence of Konishi Yukinaga, he was baptized and accepted the name "Dario". He took part in Toyotomi Hideyoshi's invasions of Korea in the 1590s, and led a force in the Siege of Busan.

The Sō clan did not participate in the Battle of Sekigahara in 1600; however, the tozama Sō clan were allowed to continue to rule Tsushima.<ref name="appert77">Appert, Georges 'et al. (1888).  Ancien Japon, p. 77.</ref>

Early life
Yoshitoshi was the fifth son of Sō Masamori; his wife, who took the baptismal name Maria, was the daughter of Konishi Yukinaga. Yoshitoshi became the head of the family in 1580, after his adoptive father, Sō Yoshishige, was defeated, and Tsushima conquered, in a prelude to Toyotomi Hideyoshi's Kyūshū Campaign.

In 1587, Toyotomi Hideyoshi confirmed the Sō clan possession of Tsushima. Yoshitoshi thus entered Hideyoshi's service; among the first major tasks he undertook on behalf of Hideyoshi was to organizing negotiations with Korea as Hideyoshi's representative. Hideyoshi, in order to fulfill the ambitions of his deceased lord Oda Nobunaga, whose authority and domains he had assumed and expanded after Nobunaga's death, had the conquest of Ming China as his ultimate goal. (Practical reasons, such as the greatly-expanded warrior class and the large number of armed forces it commanded immediately after Hideyoshi's unification of Japan, also played a larger role in Hideyoshi's reasoning; these forces actually posed a potential threat to Japan's internal stability and possibly to Hideyoshi's plans for dynastic succession.) Hideyoshi hoped to re-establish diplomatic relations with Joseon Korea and hoped to induce Korea to join his plans for a campaign against China; therefore Yoshitoshi was tasked in 1589 to deliver to Joseon Korea Hideyoshi's demand that Korea join/participate with Hideyoshi's planned campaign against China or face war with Japan.

Yoshitoshi's house, having special trading privileges with Korea (Tsushima at the time was the single checkpoint for all Japanese ships going to Korea), had a vested interest in preventing conflict between Korea and Japan, and Yoshitoshi delayed talks (he was assigned to Hideyoshi's second mission to Korea, after the first one in 1587 had failed
) for nearly two years. After Hideyoshi renewed his demands and pushed Yoshitoshi to deliver his message, Yoshitoshi, rather than delivering Hideyoshi's demands, instead reduced the visit to the Korean court to a campaign to better relations between the two countries, and was able to secure a Korean diplomatic mission to Japan, which arrived in 1590. The message the Korean envoys received from Hideyoshi, redrafted as requested on the grounds that it was too discourteous, invited Korea to submit to Japan and join in a war against China.

As Joseon was a tributary state and ally of Ming China, King Seonjo refused safe passage of Japanese troops through Korea to invade China; Hideyoshi then planned a military invasion of Korea as the first step to achieving his ultimate goal of conquering China. Yoshitoshi played a crucial role in the beginning of Hideyoshi's invasions of Korea; due to his domain of Tsushima's strategic location between Korea and Japan, as well as his knowledge of and experience with Korea, Yoshitoshi was tasked to lead the first major land assault of the war (the Siege of Busan, April 13, 1592), supported by his father-in-law, the daimyo Konishi Yukinaga. Yoshitoshi continued his command through several engagements afterwards. Ultimately the campaigns in Korea ended in failure by 1598, but Yoshitoshi was able to return to his domains in Tsushima, where he would later receive word of the Battle of Sekigahara in 1600.

After Sekigahara
Shortly after news of the Toyotomi defeat at the Battle of Sekigahara was received by the Joseon Court, a process of re-establishing diplomatic relations was initiated by Tokugawa Ieyasu in 1600.  As an initial gesture and as an earnest of future progress, some Joseon prisoners were released at Tsushima Island.  In response, a small group of messengers under the leadership of Yujeong were sent to Kyoto to investigate further.  With the assistance of Sō Yoshitomo, an audience with Ieyasu was arranged at Fushimi Castle in Kyoto.

In 1603, Tokugawa Ieyasu established a new shogunate; and Sō Yoshitoshi was officially granted Fuchū Domain (100,000 koku) in Tsushima Province.   
 
In 1604, Yujeong confirmed the Joseon interest in developing further contacts; and the Tokugawa shōgun reciprocated by releasing 1,390 prisoners-of-war.

Yoshitomo's descendants held this domain until the abolition of the han system.  The Sō would remain the shogunate's intermediaries with the Joseon government throughout the Edo period (1603–1868); and the clan would profit politically and economically.

As representatives and spokesmen for the Tokugawa, the Sō helped  ensure a continuing series of major Joseon missions to Edo (Joseon missions to the Tokugawa shogunate).  These benefited the Japanese as legitimizing propaganda for the bakufu (Tokugawa shogunate) and as a key element in an emerging manifestation of Japan's ideal vision of the structure of an international order, with Edo as its center.

In 1884, the head of this clan line was ennobled as a "Count".

See also
 Tsūkō ichiran, mid-19th century text

Notes

References

  Appert, Georges and H. Kinoshita. (1888).  Ancien Japon. Tokyo: Imprimerie Kokubunsha.
 Kang, Jae-eun and Suzanne Lee. (2006). The Land of Scholars : Two Thousand Years of Korean Confucianism. Paramus, New Jersey: Homa & Sekey Books. ; OCLC 60931394
  Papinot, Jacques Edmund Joseph. (1906) Dictionnaire d'histoire et de géographie du japon. Tokyo: Librarie Sansaisha...Click link for digitized 1906 Nobiliaire du japon (2003)
 Turnbull, Stephen (1998).  The Samurai Sourcebook. London: Arms & Armour Press. ; ;  OCLC 60220867  [reprinted by Cassell, London, 2000. ;  OCLC 59400034
 Walker, Brett L.  "Foreign Affairs and Frontiers in Early Modern Japan: A Historiographical Essay", Early Modern Japan'' (Fall 2002), pp. 44–62, 124–128.

Daimyo
People of the Japanese invasions of Korea (1592–1598)
1568 births
1615 deaths